Otto Guerra Neto (born March 5, 1956 in Porto Alegre) is a Brazilian filmmaker and animator.

Biography
Guerra studied philosophy, law and communication, without graduating on any of these courses. He made comics inspired by the Franco-Belgian comics of Hergé. In 1977, he worked in an advertising agency in Porto Alegre, doing animation for commercials. The following year, he founded his own studio, Otto Desenhos Animados. His first short film was O Natal do Burrinho, released in 1984. 

In 1995, Guerra released the feature film Rocky & Hudson - Os Caubóis Gays, based on the comic strip by Adão Iturrusgarai. In 2006, he produced Wood & Stock: Sexo, Orégano e Rock'n'Roll, based on the characters by cartoonist Angeli. In 2013, the director launched Até que a Sbórnia nos Separe, based on the musical duo Tangos e Tragédias.

Filmography

Short movies
1984 - O Natal do burrinho
1985 - As cobras - o filme 
1986 - Treiler - a última tentativa
1989 - Reino azul
1992 - Novela
1994 - Pistola automática do doutor Brain
1997 - O Arraial
2000 - Cavaleiro Jorge

Feature films
1995 - Rocky & Hudson - Os Caubóis Gays
2006 - Wood & Stock: Sexo, Orégano e Rock'n'Roll
2013 - Até que a Sbórnia nos Separe
2018 - A Cidade dos Piratas

References

External links
Otto Desenhos Animados studio site

Living people
1956 births
Brazilian animators
Brazilian animated film directors
Brazilian filmmakers
Brazilian comics artists
People from Porto Alegre